Sternberg Peak is a peak (c.1300 m) located 2.7 nautical miles (5.0 km) northeast of Rand Peak in Nebraska Peaks, Britannia Range. Named by Advisory Committee on Antarctic Names (US-ACAN) after B. Sternberg, a member of the geophysical party, Ross Ice Shelf Project, 1973–74 season.

Mountains of Oates Land